The Honourable Society of Gray's Inn, commonly known simply as Gray's Inn, is one of the four Inns of Court in London. To be called to the Bar and practise as a barrister in England and Wales, an individual must belong to one of these Inns. The Inn has existed for over 600 years. Its members have included many noted lawyers and judges, such as Francis Bacon, Lord Slynn, Lord Bingham of Cornhill, Lord Hoffmann, Lord Pannick and others. Outside the Bar and judiciary of England and Wales, members have included the clergy (including five Archbishops of Canterbury), the industrialist John Wynne, the astonomer John Lee, media figures, such as  Huw Thomas, and members of the Bar and judiciary of other nations, such as Yang Ti-liang (former Chief Justice of the Supreme Court of Hong Kong) and Aitzaz Ahsan (former president of the Supreme Court Bar Association of Pakistan). As well as full members, the Inn also offers honorary membership to particularly distinguished members of society. During the Second World War, for example, both Franklin D. Roosevelt and Winston Churchill became honorary Benchers, and therefore members. Other than honorary members, this list only contains those individuals who were called to the Bar, not those who simply joined but left before qualifying.

==Lawyers==

2019  [Barrister Syeda Mahwish Hira Ali Kazmi]  Barrister , Legal Researcher at Manupatra, Chairperson Serkar Bari Imam Foundation, Barri Law Association, Barri Stones, Barri Over-Seas Student circle , Barri Bodmass Learning & Educational Institute.

Judiciary

Politicians

Clergy

Other

Honorary members

See also
List of members of Lincoln's Inn
List of members of Middle Temple

References

Further reading

Bar of England and Wales
English law
 List